The Senate of the Philippines (Filipino: Senado ng Pilipinas, also Mataas na Kapulungan ng Pilipinas or "upper chamber") is the upper house of Congress of the bicameral legislature of the Philippines with the House of Representatives as the lower house. The Senate is composed of 24 senators who are elected at-large (the country forms one district in its elections) under plurality-at-large voting.

Senators serve six-year terms with a maximum of two consecutive terms, with half of the senators elected in staggered elections every three years. When the Senate was restored by the 1987 Constitution, the 24 senators who were elected in 1987 served until 1992. In 1992, the 12 candidates for the Senate obtaining the highest number of votes served until 1998, while the next 12 served until 1995. Thereafter, each senator elected serves the full six years. From 1945 to 1972, the Senate was a continuing body, with only eight seats up every two years.

Aside from having its concurrence on every bill in order to be passed for the president's signature to become a law, the Senate is the only body that can concur with treaties, and can try impeachment cases. The President of the Senate is the presiding officer and highest-ranking official of the Senate. They are elected by the entire body to be their leader, and is second in the Philippine presidential line of succession. The current officeholder is Migz Zubiri.

History 

The Senate has its roots in the Philippine Commission of the Insular Government. Under the Philippine Organic Act, from 1907 to 1916, the Philippine Commission headed by the Governor-General of the Philippines served as the upper chamber of the Philippine Legislature, with the Philippine Assembly as the elected lower house. At the same time the governor-general also exercised executive powers.

In August 1916 the United States Congress enacted the Philippine Autonomy Act or popularly known as the "Jones Law", which created an elected bicameral Philippine Legislature with the Senate as the upper chamber and with the House of Representatives of the Philippines, previously called the Philippine Assembly, as the lower chamber. The Governor-General continued to be the head of the executive branch of the Insular Government.  Senators then were elected via senatorial districts via plurality-at-large voting; each district grouped several provinces and each elected two senators except for "non-Christian" provinces where the Governor-General of the Philippines appointed the senators for the district.

Future president Manuel L. Quezon, who was then Philippine Resident Commissioner, encouraged future president Sergio Osmeña, then Speaker of the House, to run for the leadership of the Senate, but Osmeña preferred to continue leading the lower house. Quezon then ran for the Senate and became Senate President serving for 19 years (1916–1935).

This setup continued until 1935, when the Philippine Independence Act or the "Tydings–McDuffie Act" was passed by the U.S. Congress which granted the Filipinos the right to frame their own constitution in preparation for their independence, wherein they established a unicameral National Assembly of the Philippines, effectively abolishing the Senate. Not long after the adoption of the 1935 Constitution several amendments began to be proposed. By 1938, the National Assembly began consideration of these proposals, which included restoring the Senate as the upper chamber of Congress. The amendment of the 1935 Constitution to have a bicameral legislature was approved in 1940 and the first biennial elections for the restored upper house was held in November 1941. Instead of the old senatorial districts, senators were elected via the entire country serving as an at-large district, although still under plurality-at-large voting, with voters voting up to eight candidates, and the eight candidates with the highest number of votes being elected. While the Senate from 1916 to 1935 had exclusive confirmation rights over executive appointments, as part of the compromises that restored the Senate in 1941, the power of confirming executive appointments has been exercised by a joint Commission on Appointments composed of members of both houses. However, the Senate since its restoration and the independence of the Philippines in 1946 has the power to ratify treaties.

The Senate finally convened in 1945 and served as the upper chamber of Congress from thereon until the declaration of martial law by President Ferdinand Marcos in 1972, which shut down Congress. The Senate was resurrected in 1987 upon the ratification of the 1987 Constitution. However, instead of eight senators being replaced after every election, it was changed to twelve.

In the Senate, the officers are the Senate President, Senate President pro tempore, Majority Floor Leader, Minority Floor Leader and the Senate Secretary and the Senate Sergeant at Arms who shall be elected by the Senators from among the employees and staff of the Senate. Meanwhile, the Senate President, Senate President pro-tempore, the Majority Floor Leader and the Minority Floor Leader shall be elected by the Senators from among themselves.

Composition

Article VI, Section 2 of the 1987 Philippine Constitution provides that the Senate shall be composed of 24 senators who shall be elected at-large by the qualified voters of the Philippines, as may be provided by law.

The composition of the Senate is smaller in number as compared to the House of Representatives. The members of this chamber are elected at large by the entire electorate. The rationale for this rule intends to make the Senate a training ground for national leaders and possibly a springboard for the presidency.

It follows also that the Senator, will have a broader outlook of the problems of the country, instead of being restricted by narrow viewpoints and interests by having a national rather than only a district constituency.

Senatorial candidates are chosen by the leaders of major political parties or coalitions of parties.  The selection process is not transparent and is done in "backrooms" where much political horse-trading occurs.  Thus, the absence of regional or proportional representation in the Senate exacerbates a top heavy system of governance, with power centralized in Metro Manila.  It has often been suggested that each region of the country should elect its own senator(s) to more properly represent the people.  This will have the effect of flattening the power structure.  Regional problems and concerns within a national view can be addressed more effectively.  A senator's performance, accountability, and electability become meaningful to a more defined and identifiable regional constituency.

The Senate Electoral Tribunal (SET) composed of three Supreme Court justices and six senators determines election protests on already-seated senators. There had been three instances where the SET has replaced senators due to election protests, the last of which was in 2011 when the tribunal awarded the protest of Koko Pimentel against Migz Zubiri.

Qualifications
The qualifications for membership in the Senate are expressly stated in Section 3, Art. VI of the 1987 Philippine Constitution as follows:

No person shall be a Senator unless he is a natural-born citizen of the Philippines, and on the day of the election, is at least 35 years of age, able to read and write, a registered voter, and a resident of the Philippines for not less than two years immediately preceding the day of the election.
The age is fixed at 35 and must be possessed on the day of the elections, that is, when the polls are opened and the votes cast, and not on the day of the proclamation of the winners by the board of canvassers.
With regard to the residence requirements, it was ruled in the case of Lim v. Pelaez that it must be the place where one habitually resides and to which he, after absence, has the intention of returning.
The enumeration laid down by the 1987 Philippine Constitution is exclusive under the Latin principle of expressio unius est exclusio alterius. This means that Congress cannot anymore add additional qualifications other than those provided by the 1987 Philippine Constitution.

Organization
Under the Constitution, "Congress shall convene once every year on the fourth Monday of July for its regular session...". During this time, the Senate is organized to elect its officers. Specifically, the 1987 Philippine Constitution provides a definite statement to it:

By virtue of these provisions of the 1987 Philippine Constitution, the Senate adopts its own rules, otherwise known as the "Rules of the Senate." The Rules of the Senate provide the following officers: a President, a President pro tempore, a Secretary and a Sergeant-at-Arms.

Following this set of officers, the Senate as an institution can then be grouped into the Senate Proper and the Secretariat. The former belongs exclusively to the members of the Senate as well as its committees, while the latter renders support services to the members of the Senate.

Powers
The Senate was modeled upon the United States Senate; the two chambers of Congress have roughly equal powers, and every bill or resolution that has to go through both houses needs the consent of both chambers before being passed for the president's signature. Once a bill is defeated in the Senate, it is lost. Once a bill is approved by the Senate on third reading, the bill is passed to the House of Representatives, unless an identical bill has also been passed by the lower house. When a counterpart bill in the lower house is different from the one passed by the Senate, either a bicameral conference committee is created consisting of members from both chambers of Congress to reconcile the differences, or either chamber may instead approve the other chamber's version.

While franchise and money bills originate in the House of Representatives, the Senate may still propose or concur with amendments. Only the Senate has the power to approve, via a two-thirds supermajority, or denounce treaties, and the power to try and convict, via a two-thirds supermajority, an impeached official.

Current members

Seat

The Senate currently meets at the GSIS Building along Jose Diokno Boulevard in Pasay. Built on land reclaimed from Manila Bay, the Senate shares the complex with the Government Service Insurance System (GSIS).

The Senate previously met at the Old Legislative Building in Manila until May 1997. The Senate occupied the upper floors (the Session Hall now restored to its semi-former glory) while the House of Representatives occupied the lower floors (now occupied by the permanent exhibit of Juan Luna's Spoliarium as the museum's centerpiece), with the National Library at the basement. When the Legislative Building was ruined in World War II, the House of Representatives temporarily met at the Old Japanese Schoolhouse at Lepanto Street (modern-day S. H. Loyola Street), while the Senate's temporary headquarters was at the half-ruined Manila City Hall. Congress then returned to the Legislative Building in 1950 upon its reconstruction. When President Ferdinand Marcos dissolved Congress in 1972, he built a new legislative complex in Quezon City. The unicameral parliament known as the Batasang Pambansa eventually met there in 1978. With the restoration of the bicameral legislature in 1987, the House of Representatives inherited the complex at Quezon City, now called the Batasang Pambansa Complex, while the Senate returned to the Congress Building, until the GSIS Building was finished in 1997. Thus, the country's two houses of Congress meet at different places in Metro Manila.

The Senate would eventually move to Navy Village in Fort Bonifacio, Taguig by April 2023, delayed from July 2022. As the Senate has rented GSIS for the office space, it asked the Bases Conversion and Development Authority (BCDA) to present suitable sites for it to move to, with the Senate eyeing the Navy Village property along Lawton Avenue as its favored site. In 2018, a building designed by AECOM was chosen as winner for the new home for the Senate and was expected to be built by 2022. Civil works to erect the building had been awarded to Hilmarcs Construction Corporation, the same company the Senate investigated for alleged overpriced construction of the Makati City Hall Parking Building II in 2015. The reception to the design was mixed, with some Filipino netizens comparing it to a garbage can. By early 2021, the new Senate building's construction was delayed due to the COVID-19 pandemic in the Philippines.

Historical makeup

This is how the Senate looked like after the beginning of every Congress under the 1987 constitution. The parties are arranged alphabetically, with independents at the rightmost side. Vacancies are denoted by dashes after the independents. Senators may switch parties or become independents mid-term.

Prominent senators

Presidents

Manuel L. Quezon, 2nd President, also the first Senate President, lobbied for a nationally elected senate that was established in 1940.
José P. Laurel, 3rd President (Japanese-sponsored republic)
Sergio Osmeña, 4th President
Manuel Roxas, 5th President, also served as Senate President.
Elpidio Quirino, 6th President

Carlos P. Garcia, 8th President

Ferdinand Marcos, 10th President, also served as Senate President.

Joseph Estrada, 13th President
Gloria Macapagal Arroyo, 14th President
Benigno Aquino III, 15th President

Bongbong Marcos, 17th President

Other senators
Benigno S. Aquino Jr., Marcos-era co-opposition leader, husband of the 11th President Corazon C. Aquino, and father of the 15th President Benigno S. Aquino III.
Miriam Defensor Santiago, former International Criminal Court judge, Ramon Magsaysay Award recipient, member of the International Development Law Organization International Advisory Council, and former presidential candidate.
Jose W. Diokno, father of human rights, Marcos-era co-opposition leader, nationalist, former Secretary of Justice, Bar topnotcher, and founder of the Free Legal Assistance Group and the Commission on Human Rights.
Franklin Drilon, Senate President, former Liberal Party chairman, and tied with Lorenzo Tañada for the longest tenure as elected senator.
Marcelo Fernan, former Chief Justice (1988–1991) and former Senate President (1998–1999); only Filipino to have served as chief of the Senate and the Judiciary.
Teofisto Guingona Jr., the 11th Vice President of the Philippines and former Secretary of Foreign Affairs.
Eva Estrada Kalaw, Marcos-era opposition leader
Raul Manglapus, former Secretary of Foreign Affairs and a former presidential candidate.
Blas Ople, president of the 60th International Labour Conference of the International Labour Organization (ILO) and former Secretary of Foreign Affairs.
Cipriano P. Primicias Sr., Majority Floor Leader and Member of The Council of State, 1953–1963.
Aquilino Pimentel Jr., Marcos-era co-opposition leader, Senate President (2000–2001), and former PDP–Laban chairman.
Gil J. Puyat, Senate President (1967–1972).
Edgardo Angara, father of the senior citizens discount and free higschool law and former University of the Philippines president.
Claro M. Recto, poet
Francisco 'Soc' Rodrigo, playwright, poet, journalist, broadcaster, lawyer, professor, and Marcos-era opposition supporter.
Raul Roco, 2001 and 2004 presidential candidate, former Secretary of the Department of Education.
Jovito Salonga, three-time top elected senator, Marcos-era opposition leader, former Chairman of the Presidential Commission on Good Government (PCGG).
Lorenzo Tañada, Marcos-era opposition leader, #1 senator in 1947, and longest serving senator of 24 years tied with Tito Sotto, Franklin Drilon and Loren Legarda from 1947 to 1972. Dubbed "The Grand Old Man of Philippine Politics".
Neptali Gonzales, elected three times as Senate president, former Minister of Justice, member of Batasang Pambansa, Vice Governor of Rizal, and dean of the College of Law of the Far Eastern University.

References

External links
Official Website
Official Government Portal

 
1916 establishments in the Philippines
Philippines